The KTLA 5 Morning News is an American morning television news program airing on KTLA (channel 5), a CW-affiliated television station in Los Angeles, California owned by the Nexstar Media Group. The program broadcasts each weekday morning from 4 am to 12 pm Pacific Time. The 4-7 am portion is a general news/traffic/weather format; the 7 am-12 pm portion also features news, traffic, and weather but emphasizes entertainment and other light-hearted stories (incorporating celebrity interviews–both in-studio and occasionally via satellite – as well as features such as fashion and food segments). Weekend editions of the program also air on Saturday and Sunday from 6-11 am

The 7-10 am portion of the program was simulcast on its San Diego sister station KSWB-TV (channel 69, also owned by Tribune and at the time the simulcast began, was an affiliate of The WB) from March 7, 2005, to July 31, 2008 (under the name The WB Morning Show, and then to The CW Morning Show upon becoming a CW affiliate); KSWB later relaunched an in-house news department on August 1, 2008, after switching its affiliation from The CW to Fox and debuted its own locally produced morning newscast on the date of the affiliation switch.

History
The program began on July 8, 1991 as The KTLA Morning News, anchored by Carlos Amezcua and Barbara Beck, with weathercaster Mark Kriski, and Eric Spillman and Michele Ruiz reporting from remote locations. It was created under the direction of then-general manager Steve Bell and produced by Raymond J. Brune. Originally a two-hour program airing from 7-9 am, the show's emphasis was mostly on news, with very little on lighter features. With the emphasis on hard news, the show received poor ratings and some negative reviews. Near the end of 1991, Joel Tator, a new executive producer, had been brought in to help revive the show by giving the show a more relaxed atmosphere by spreading out newspapers on the desk. The anchors, feeling that the show was in its final weeks, also relaxed, and they started joking around.

The critical moment for the Morning News came in February 1992, when a series of rain storms hit the Southland, causing severe flooding in the San Fernando Valley. At that time, the only other news programs on in the morning were the national news shows on ABC (Good Morning America), NBC (Today) and CBS (CBS This Morning), which were all broadcast on a three-hour tape delay in the Pacific Time Zone, with limited live coverage during the local news segments. Filling a need, KTLA set aside its normal programming and provided extensive coverage of the flooding. That brought in large numbers of Southland viewers; once the flood crisis ended, the viewers stayed with the show. And as a result, ratings improved dramatically.

Another critical moment for the Morning News occurred on January 17, 1994, when the Northridge earthquake rocked the area, causing widespread damage, collapsing freeways, sparked power outages, ruptured water and gas lines, prompted the stoppage of television and film production, and altered public events and flight schedules due to precaution closures in Hollywood and Los Angeles International Airport. The quake almost trashed the KTLA newsroom when reporters Eric Spillman, Larry McCormick, Stan Chambers and Michele Ruiz were producing special reports throughout the morning.

With the new relaxed atmosphere and a need to provide live, local news when the other stations could not, the show survived. The program continued to succeed even as the newscast saw new competition with the debut of Good Day L.A. on Fox-owned KTTV (channel 11) in July 1993. Around 1998, Michele Ruiz left for NBC-owned KNBC (channel 4) and Jim Newman also left for ABC-owned KABC (channel 7). On May 2, 2001, Barbara Beck resigned from KTLA with Giselle Fernandez later becoming co-anchor. In 2003, Fernandez left and was replaced by Michaela Pereira. In September 2007, Carlos Amezcua left KTLA for KTTV to replace John Beard as anchor on that station's 10 pm newscast. In May 2013, Pereira left KTLA, to become an anchor for CNN's morning news program New Day.

In September 2006, KTLA changed the subtitles of each portion of the morning newscast. The 5 am hour was renamed KTLA Morning News First Edition, the 6 am hour was retitled KTLA Morning News Early Edition, and the 7-10 am portion was renamed the KTLA Morning Show. The newscasts underwent another retitling on February 4, 2008, to bring the entire program back under the KTLA Morning News brand, with the hour of the particular portion of the program included in the title for the 5, 6, and 9 am hours. On February 2, 2012, the KTLA Morning News was expanded by an extra hour, starting at 4 am

In April 2011, KTLA added a weekend morning extension of the newscast, airing on Saturdays initially from 6-7 am – later expanding to 5-7 am in September 2012 (airing in the early time slot due to The CW's children's program block) – and on Sundays from 6-9 am; On May 9, 2014, the Saturday morning newscast was expanded to three hours and moved to 6:00 to 9:00 am, in a uniform timeslot as the Sunday morning newscast and following the death of Chris Burrous, is currently anchored by Lynette Romero with Liberte Chan covering weather, who also work during the week in other assignments. The addition made KTLA the fourth Tribune-owned station to carry a weekend morning newscast (the others being fellow CW affiliate WGN-TV in Chicago – which twice ran weekend morning newscasts, first from 1992 to 1998 (the Saturday edition of that program having only remained by the time of its cancellation) and again since 2010, and Fox affiliates WXIN in Indianapolis and WTIC-TV in Hartford).

KTLA offers midday news from 12 noon to 2 pm (Pacific Time) as part of the extended morning local newscast, the evening news from 6 to 7 pm, and late night news from 10 to 11:35 pm (Monday through Friday).

On the morning of 14 September 2022, Sam Rubin announced on the air that Lynette Romero had left her anchor position with KTLA. On Saturday September 17, Mark Mester apologized on air to both viewers and Romero for this, after which he was suspended by the station.

Personalities
Weatherman Mark Kriski and reporter Eric Spillman are the only remaining personalities currently appearing on the program who have been with the KTLA Morning News since its 1991 debut. Entertainment reporter Sam Rubin came on board approximately six months later and remains to this day.

Current on-air staff
 Chris Schauble – 4-7 am anchor
 Megan Henderson – 4-7 am anchor
 Sam Rubin – entertainment reporter
 Mark Kriski – 7-11 am weather anchor
 Frank Buckley – 7-11 am anchor
 Jessica Holmes – 7-11 am anchor
 Eric Spillman – field reporter
 Gayle Anderson – feature field reporter
 Kaj Goldberg - 11 am-12 pm weather anchor 
 Kacey Montoya - 11 am-12 pm weather anchor 
 Lu Parker – 11am-12 pm anchor
 Glen Walker – 11 am-12 pm anchor
 Henry Dicarlo - 4 am-7 am weather anchor 
 Ginger Chan - 4 am-10 am traffic anchor

Notable former staff
 Carlos Amezcua – original anchor (moved to KTTV and then served as co-anchor at KUSI in San Diego, California.)
 Asha Blake
 Chris Burrous (deceased)
 Cher Calvin (now 6 pm and 10 pm weeknight anchor at KTLA)
 Dayna Devon
 Yomary Cruz –now voice actor of Sheila in Red vs. Blue
 Giselle Fernández - Now an anchor with Spectrum News 1: Southern California.
 Roger Lodge – "The Sports Lodge" sports talk contributor (2010-2012) 
 Mark Mester 
 Michaela Pereira – now with KTTV
 Christina Pascucci - now with KTTV
 Lynette Romero – former 6 am-11 am weekend anchor and weekday reporter, now with KNBC
 Michele Ruiz – now President and CEO of Ruiz Strategies, and formerly founder and CEO of Saber Hacer, a bilingual “how-to” site
 Sharon Tay – now Real Estate agent with Berkshire Hathaway in Los Angeles
 Jennifer York – Multiple Emmy award-winning aerial traffic reporter

See also
WGN Morning News - similar morning news and entertainment program on sister station WGN-TV in Chicago, Illinois.

References

Local news programming in the United States
1991 American television series debuts